Cameron McHarg is a Los Angeles based director, actor, and creator and host of the Triumph & Disaster podcast.

Early life and career
McHarg was born and raised in Everett, Washington. He served in the U.S. Marine Corps and went on to study at the former Lee Strasberg Actors Workshop in Seattle. He soon after moved to Los Angeles to work as an actor and to pursue his BFA in film from Art Center College of Design in Pasadena, CA, where he won the Gold Addy and Silver Telly Awards and was shortlisted for the Cannes Young Director Award. His short films, “Kicking Sand in Your Face” and “the end” premiered on the international film festival circuit and sold to cable networks in the US, Canada, Russia, and Ukraine. He was also named in the second edition of The Top 100 Independent Filmmakers in the World. McHarg is also the creator and host of the Triumph & Disaster podcast on iTunes, which is focused on manly culture and creativity, and has included guests such as directors Mark Pellington (Arlington Road), Tony Kaye (American History X), and actors such as Doug Jones (The Shape of Water).

As of 2017, the two feature films penned by McHarg (Sitiado and Monroe Log) are in pre-production and development and for him to both direct and act in.

References

American film directors
Living people
Year of birth missing (living people)